Haval may refer to

 Haval (marque), a Chinese automobile marque owned by Great Wall Motors
 Haval (rapper), Swedish rapper
 HAVAL, a cryptographic hash function

See also
 Havel (disambiguation)